Mahashrung is a mountain peak located at  above sea level in the far west of the Transhimalaya.

Location 
The peak is located in the south of Padmanabh. It is one of the highest peaks on the Teram Shehr plateau.

References 

Mountains of the Transhimalayas
Six-thousanders of the Transhimalayas
Mountains of Ladakh